The Book of the Homeless is a 1916 collection of essays, art, poetry, and musical scores. Proceeds of its sales were used to fund civilians displaced by World War I. It was edited by Edith Wharton

Contents

 A letter from Joseph Joffre
 An introduction from Theodore Roosevelt
 A preface by Edith Wharton

Other Works 
 "The Brothers" by Maurice Barrès
 "A Promise" by Sarah Bernhardt
 "The Orphans of Flanders" by Laurence Binyon
 "One Year Later" by Paul Bourget
 "The Dance" by Rupert Brooke
 "The Precious Blood" by Paul Claudel
 "by How the Young Men died in Hellas" Jean Cocteau
 "Poland Revisited" by Joseph Conrad
 "La légende de Saint Christophe" by Vincent d'Indy
 "The Right to Liberty" by Eleonora Duse
 "Harvest" by John Galsworthy
 "The Arrogance and Servility of Germany" by Edmund Gosse
 "A Message" by Robert Grant
 "Cry of the Homeless" by Thomas Hardy
 "Science and Conscience" by Paul Hervieu
 "The Little Children" by William Dean Howells
 "An Heroic Stand" by Georges Louis Humbert
 "The Long Wards" by Henry James
 "An Epitaph" by Francis Jammes
 "Our Inheritance" by Maurice Maeterlinck
 "We Who Sit Afar Off" by Edward Sandford Martin
 "In Sleep" by Alice Meynell
 "A Moment of Tragic Purgation" by Paul Elmer More
 "Our Dead" by Anna de Noailles
 "Two Songs of a Year: 1914-1915" by Josephine Preston Peabody
 "Rain in Belgium" by Lilla Cabot Perry
 "The Russian Bogyman" by Agnes Repplier
 "The Exile" by Henri de Régnier
 "Horror and Beauty" by Edmond Rostand
 "The Undergraduate Killed in Battle" by George Santayana
 "Souvenir d'une marche boche" by Igor Stravinsky
 "Song of the Welsh Women" by André Suarès
 "The Children and the Flag" by Edith M. Thomas
 "The Troubler of Telaro" by Herbert Trench
 "The New Spring" by Émile Verhaeren
 "Wordsworth's Valley in War-time" by Mary Augusta Ward
 "1915" by Barrett Wendell
 "The Tryst" by Edith Wharton
 "Finisterre" by Margaret L. Woods
 "A Reason for Keeping Silent" by W. B. Yeats

References

External links

The Book of the Homeless (Le livre des sans-foyer) by Léon Bakst et al Gutenberg text

Art for charity
1916 books